Tischendorf is a German surname. Notable people with the surname include:

Constantin von Tischendorf (1815–1874), German theologian
 (born 1997), Norwegian snowboarder
Philipp Tischendorf (born 1988), German figure skater

German-language surnames